Zagorje may refer to:

Places 
Zagori, a mountainous region in Epirus (Greece and Albania)

Bosnia and Herzegovina
Zagorje (Posušje),  a village in Bosnia and Herzegovina

Croatia
Zagorje, Ogulin, settlement in Karlovac County
Hrvatsko Zagorje ("Croatian Zagorje"), a region in northern Croatia

Kosovo
Zogaj-Zagorje, a village in Kosovo

Montenegro
Zagorje, Berane Municipality

Slovenia
Municipality of Zagorje ob Savi, a municipality in Slovenia
Zagorje ob Savi, the administrative centre
Zagorje, Pivka, a village in Slovenia
Zagorje, Kozje, a village in Slovenia
Zagorje, Sveti Tomaž, a village in Slovenia

Other uses 
NK Zagorje, a Slovenian football club

See also
 
Krapina-Zagorje County, in Croatia
Zagore (disambiguation)
Zagora (disambiguation)
Zagori (disambiguation)
Záhorie, a region in Slovakia